Isa TK+ (Isa Te Quiero Más) the second season of the original Nickelodeon Latin America production Isa TKM. In co-production with Sony Pictures Television and Teleset of Colombia. Production started in July 2009 and its official release was 28 September 2009 in Hispanic America. The release in Brazil was on 5 April 2010 and of the United States is not confirmed.

History 
Having succeeded with Isa TKM, has launched a sequel which is being recorded this time in Colombia. It is written by Julio César Mámol Junior, Gino Berríos and Daniel Gonzalez.

"Isa TK+ is the evolution of Isa TKM, and we are happy to bring this production together with Nickelodeon to various countries in Latin America," said Marlon Quintero, Vice President of Development Programs and Production, Sony Pictures Television.

He added that for this second phase will be to find favorite stories to create fresh stories and find new friends.

The distribution of Isa TK+ comprises María Gabriela de Faría, Reinaldo Zavarce, Willy Martin, and Micaela Castelotti. They play the roles of Isa, Alex, Rey, and Linda in Isa TKM. Also the actress Milena Torres appears, but this time as a guest star. And so, there is new faces as Carolina Gaitán and Ricardo Abarca.

"After the incredible success and acceptance of Isa TKM in Latin America and United States, was a natural decision for us to proceed with one of the most beloved stories of the channel by the audience," said Tatiana Rodriguez, Vice President of Programming and Creative Strategy of the channel in Latin America.

She added "For Nickelodeon our viewers are most important, and that´s a reason for commitment to showing a quality programming. We are confident that captivates not only for its plot but also for the great work of production"

They also comment that they would perhaps film a 3rd season and a new movie.

Filming 

Isa TK+ began filming in mid-July 2009. It began to be recorded in Barranquilla and Bogotá, Colombia with the exception of the scenes on the first episodes in which the actress Milena Torres (Cristina Ricalde) appears due to her inability to travel to Colombia with the rest of the cast at the time. Those scenes were recorded in Venezuela. Later on, however, she went to Colombia to shoot her special appearance in the episodes 25 to 41. The production planned to release between 60 and 70 episodes and then they will finish recording in mid-November or early December. It was also confirmed that new school's theater where Isa and the band will give concerts and parties will be the Teresiano school of Bogota's coliseum.

Synopsis 

Since the ending of Isa TKM, Isabella "Isa" Pasqualli and her band have become a huge success worldwide and she has signed a contract with "Zafiro Label", which will sent her abroad to study at Colegio Bravo, a special school for young artists, so as to further her musical formation. Her best friend, Linda Luna "Gordilinda", also has achieved to win a scholarship at Bravo and will now be attending the school to fulfil her dream of becoming a ballerina.

Finally, Alejandro "Alex" Ruiz and Reinaldo "Rey" Galán, each girl's respective boyfriend, will follow them a couple of days later and become students of Bravo themselves, the first to become a guitarist and the later to be an actor.

But even being together they'll find out that not everything is so fine when Catalina Bernabeu, an evil girl who pretends to be sweet, starts scheming along her sidekick, Jessica "Jess" Chen, to ruin Isa's career, win Alex' affections and get Linda expelled; while Sebastian Lorenzo "Sebas" tries to win Isa's heart by any means.

Rey and Linda will also experience problems because of their new classmates, Sandra Centeno "Sandijuela", Rey's new lovestruck friend and Javier "Javi" Mooner "Javi", Linda's dance partner, who feels attracted to her.

Also, principal Violeta Marindo, or "La Tamarindo", a sour woman that dislikes Isa and her friends, will make use of everything in her power to get rid of the gang, and Cristina Ricalde "Cristarantula", the main antagonist from the previous series, will return on many occasions to try to get revenge at Isa and her friends.

Cast

Main cast 

María Gabriela de Faría as Isabella Pascuali
Reinaldo Zavarce as Alejandro Ruiz "Alex".
Willy Martin as Reinaldo Galán "Rey"
Micaela Castellotti as Linda Luna "Gordilinda"
Carolina Gaitán as Catalina Bernabeu "Cataclismica"
Ricardo Abarca as Sebastian Lorenzo "Sebas"

Starring role
Milena Torres as Cristina Ricalde "Cristarántula" (Ep. 25–41) (Returns:115+)

Support cast 
Yaneth Waldman as Violeta Marindo "La Tamarindo"
Sebastián Vega as Enrique Toro "Kike"
Mickie Moreno as Mateo Flores
Vanessa Blandón as Natalia Tarazona "Naty"
Gabriela Cortés as Jessica Chen "Jess"
Juan Sebastián Quintero as Javier Mooner "Javi"
Diana Neira Canales as Sandra Centeno "Sandijuela"
Natalia Reyes as Fabiana Medina "Fabi"
Anderson Otalvaro as Fernando Jimenez "Nando"
Viviana Pulido as Agata Montenegro "Monteblack"
Mauro Urquijo as Alvaro Lorenzo
Salomé Quinteros as Marisol
Juan Carlos Messie as Director Andy Roca
Adriana Silva as Teacher Cecilia
Jean Carlos Posada as Abelardo Flores
Linda Carreño as Camila Flores
Julio Sánchez as Teacher Francisco

Special guests
Juan Fernando Sánchez as Vladimir Lugozi (Ep.98–104)
Santiago Ramundo as Luca (Ep.120)
Willy Martin as Grandmother Galán
Diana Neira Canales as Samanta Centeno

Characters 

 Isabella "Isa" Pasquali: Is a beautiful 18-year-old nice and happy girl that charms everybody with her radiant personality and sweet voice. By this time, she is very famous and has many fans. Because of this, her record studio sends her to the "Colegio Bravo", where she'll complete her studies in an attempt to fulfill her dreams alongside her boyfriend Alex.
 Alejandro "Alex" Ruiz: Isa's boyfriend, who is really in love with her and whose best friend this time will be a boy nicknamed "Kike". Music is his favorite activity, and he is very happy and concerned for others. Sebastian will be his rival because of his continuous attempts to seduce Isa, and he'll also discover that Catalina Bernabeu has strong feelings for him.
  Linda "Gordilinda" Luna: She is a very sensitive, funny, charismatic and loyal friend. She and Isa are best friends and also she is considered by many to be very pretty. It turns out that she will become a ballerina. She entered the same academy on a scholarship for her dancing skills. Unfortunately, the scholarship does not cover the entire cost of their stay, so this will force her to work part-time in the computer room. She's Rey's girlfriend at the start of the story. However, a student named Javier will show some interest in her, so she'll have numerous dilemmas and confusions throughout her studying career.
 Reinaldo "Rey" Galán: His attitude has not changed at all through the course of time, and remains somewhat conceited. He enters into the academy because his grandmother gave him the money. He will be devoted to acting. He's Linda's boyfriend when arriving at the academy, but he'll meet a pretty girl named Sandra Centeno, who will make him think about whether his relationship with Linda is really worth it after all, so his relationship with Linda may be at risk.
 Catalina "Cataclismica" Bernabeu: She pretends to be a sympathetic, tender and sweet girl, but she is a misleading, mysterious and malignant antagonist who tricks Isa throughout the story without notice. Her antagonistic goals seem to come from her dream of becoming a famous singer. Her voice is not considered to be perfect, making her live in the shadows of stronger celebrities such as Isa. She has many nicknames, commonly being a portmanteau of her name and a word that denotes catastrophe.
 Sebastián "Sebas" Lorenzo: One of the most popular boys of the Bravo school. His father is a powerful music producer who always seems to get his in trouble. He'll be Alex's rival and Rey's bedroom partner. He falls in love with Isa shortly after her arrival.
 Cristina "Cristarantula" Ricalde: Principal Violeta's niece and main antagonist of the previous series. Cristina is a manipulative and bratty daddy's girl, that grew used to always get her way. After living a mid-class life for some time after her father went bankrupt, Cristina became a top model and once again had a great fortune. She applies for a place at Colegio Bravo, so as to come back and try to ruin Isa's life. Her nickname is a portmanteau of her name and Tarantula.
 Violeta Marindo "La Tamarindo": Executive Principal of Colegio Bravo. She's an arrogant and sour woman that dislikes joyfulness and creativity, thus dislikes Isa, her friends and many other Bravo students. She carries a bottle of homemade perfume and constantly sprays it on, much to everyone's annoyance. She also commonly misspells other people's last names, for example calling Isa "Pastrami" instead of Pasquali. Her nickname is a pun on how the last syllable of her name and her last name spell "Tamarindo", tamarind
 Enrique "Kike" Toro: He's Alex' roommate and new best friend. He's a nerdy, but funny boy that is always over-analyzing everything. He also has some strange customs and manias.
 Natalia "Naty" Tarazona: Naty is Isa's roommate and a gifted keyboardist. Though she's nice and pretty, she can be quite obsessive, specially to things regarding to Sebas, who is not only one of her best friends but also her love interest. She will compete with Fabi for Sebas' heart.
 Jessica Chen "Jess": She's Catalina's roommate, sidekick and, presumably, best friend. Jess' business is gossip, she knows the secrets of everyone at Bravo and even has a webpage in which she publishes the juiciest news. She often does Catalina's dirty work loyally, even if it means that she'll get in trouble herself.
 Javier "Javi" Mooner: One of Alex' new friends and rival of Rey. Javi is a hyperactive but charming boy that can't seem to stay still and is always dancing around the halls of the school. He feels heavily attracted to Linda, and although he isn't a bad person, he exploits Rey's flaws to get him and Linda to break up.
 Sandra "Sandijuela" Centeno: Rey's acting classmate and friend. Sandi is a cute and clumsy girl that has a thing for strange fashion and is commonly seen wearing colorful wigs and accessories. Even though she feels attracted to Rey since the very moment they meet, she respects that he has a girlfriend and decides to stay a helpful friend to him, hoping that he'll fall in love with her. Her nickname is a pun on "Sanguijuela", Spanish for leech.
 Fabiana "Fabi" Medina: One of Isa's roommates and friend of Sebas. Fabi is beautiful, but lacks any specific talent and sometimes can come across childish or even rude. Like Naty, Fabi is in love with Sebas, and so uses her lack of talent to get Sebas to spend time with her.
 Agata "Monteblack" Montenegro: Agata is Violeta's chum and hall monitor for the girls dormitory. Even though she comes out straight as a serious person, she's actually simplistic and sweet girl. Agata has been trained by Violeta since she was a freshman to become her successor and she was always determined to do so. However, her newly made friendships and relationship with Kike make her doubt about this. Her nickname is based on how "Negro" means black.
 Alvaro Lorenzo: Sebas' father and owner of a powerful label. Alvaro is a shady man that cares little for anybody that isn't himself. He wants Sebas to approach Isa so he can get her to sign with his label and abandon Zafiro.
 Andy Roca: Creative Principal of Colegio Bravo. He's a good, somewhat strict man that cares deeply for the well-being and development of his students. Andy constantly clashes with Violeta, and often foils her plans to get rid of Isa and her friends.
 Abelardo Flores: The school's janitor and handyman, also a good friend to Isa and Alex. Abelardo lives with his family in the school and sometimes helps the students with their problems.

Episodes

See also 
 Nickelodeon Latin America
 Isa TKM
 Skimo
 Sueña conmigo

References

External links 
 Official page
 Guarida Azul, Isa TK+ Official social network
 Toca Azul, Brazilian version of Guarida Azul
 Isa TK+ Pictures
 Isa TK+ photos

Colombian telenovelas
2009 telenovelas
Spanish-language telenovelas
Children's telenovelas
Musical telenovelas
Television series by Teleset
Sony Pictures Television telenovelas
Spanish-language Nickelodeon original programming
Nickelodeon telenovelas
Isa TKM
Television series about teenagers